This article presents a list of the historical events and publications of Australian literature during 1946.

Books 
 James Aldridge – Of Many Men
 Dora Birtles – The Overlanders : A Novel
 Capel Boake – The Twig is Bent
 Martin Boyd – Lucinda Brayford
 Errol Flynn – Showdown
 Miles Franklin – My Career Goes Bung
 Catherine Gaskin – This Other Eden
 Michael Innes
 From London Far
 What Happened at Hazlewood
 Katharine Susannah Prichard – The Roaring Nineties
 Christina Stead – Letty Fox: Her Luck
 Kylie Tennant – Lost Haven
 Arthur Upfield – The Devil's Steps

Short stories 
 Jon Cleary – These Small Glories
 Alan Marshall
 "The Grey Kangaroo"
 Tell Us About the Turkey, Jo : Short Stories
 Vance Palmer – '"The Foal"
 Douglas Stewart – "The Three Jolly Foxes"
 Dal Stivens – The Courtship of Uncle Henry : A Collection of Tales and Stories

Children's and Young Adult fiction 
 Leslie Rees – The Story of Karrawingi the Emu

Poetry 

 Rosemary Dobson – "In My End is My Beginning"
 Dorothy Hewett – "Clancy and Dooley and Don Mcleod"
 James Macauley – Under Aldebaran
 George Mackaness – Poets of Australia: An Anthology of Australian Verse (compiled)
 J. S. Manifold
 Selected Verse
 "The Bunyip and the Whistling Kettle"
 John Shaw Neilson – "To the Red Lory"
 Will H. Ogilvie – From Sunset to Dawn
 Elizabeth Riddell – "The Letter"
 Douglas Stewart – The Dosser in Springtime
 Judith Wright
 "The Killer"
 The Moving Image : Poems
 "Woman to Child"
 "Woman to Man"

Drama 
 Dymphna Cusack – Eternal Now : A Play in Three Acts
 Sumner Locke Elliott – The Invisible Circus : A Play in Three Acts
 Louis Esson – The Southern Cross and Other Plays 
 Nevil Shute – Vinland the Good

Biography 
 Alec H. Chisholm – The Making of the Sentimental Bloke : A Sketch of the Remarkable Career of C.J. Dennis

Awards and honours

Note: these awards were presented in the year in question.

Literary

Children's and Young Adult

Births 

A list, ordered by date of birth (and, if the date is either unspecified or repeated, ordered alphabetically by surname) of births in 1946 of Australian literary figures, authors of written works or literature-related individuals follows, including year of death.

 4 February – Jean Bedford, novelist
 26 February – Gabrielle Lord, novelist
 5 March – Mem Fox, writer for children
 10 March – Peter Temple, novelist (died 2018)
 14 May – Raimond Gaita, author
 1 July – Stephen Matthews, author
 1 August – Michael Sharkey, poet
 25 August – Shelton Lea, poet (died 2005)
 5 September – Lily Brett, poet and novelist
 17 October – Drusilla Modjeska, biographer and novelist

Unknown date
 Sally Morrison, novelist and biographer
 Peter Robb, novelist
 Rod Usher, poet and novelist

Deaths 

A list, ordered by date of death (and, if the date is either unspecified or repeated, ordered alphabetically by surname) of deaths in 1946 of Australian literary figures, authors of written works or literature-related individuals follows, including year of birth.

 23 February – Mary Eliza Fullerton, novelist (born 1868)
 20 March – Henry Handel Richardson, novelist (born 1870)
 18 November — Walter J. Turner, poet and playwright (born 1889)

See also 
 1946 in poetry
 1946 in literature
 List of years in literature
 List of years in Australian literature
 1946 in literature
 1945 in Australian literature
 1946 in Australia
 1947 in Australian literature

References

Literature
Australian literature by year
20th-century Australian literature
1946 in literature